Artawheel Tire Industrial Complex (Mijitim'-e Sân'ti-ye Ârtaveil-e Tair), operating under the brand Goldstone Tires is an Iranian tire manufacturer for automobiles, commercial trucks, light trucks, SUVs, race cars, airplanes, and heavy earth-mover machinery.

Artawheel Tire is currently the largest non-government owned tire manufacturer in Iran by marketshare. The company currently has agreements with Iran Khodro to develop tires for the Peugeot 206 Models

Operations 
When the company was established, Goldstone had a primary annual production capacity of 5,000 tones. However, in 2009 this figure has increased to 25,000 tones per year.

Goldstone Tires is currently one of the largest exporters of tires in Iran.

See also 
 Yazd Tire

References

External links 
Company webpage

Tire manufacturers of Iran
Manufacturing companies based in Tehran
Iranian brands
Ardabil
Economy of Iranian Azerbaijan